Opytnoye Khozyaystvo (Täjribä xujalığı) is a rural locality (a village) in Krasnoyarsky Selsoviet, Ufimsky District, Bashkortostan, Russia. The population was 149 as of 2010. It comprises 6 streets.

Geography 
Opytnoye Khozyaystvo is located 26 km north of Ufa (the district's administrative centre) by road. Krasny Yar is the nearest rural locality.

References 

Rural localities in Ufimsky District